Sinothela is a genus of spiders in the family Liphistiidae. It was first described in 2003 by Haupt. , it contains 4 species, all from China.

References

Liphistiidae
Mesothelae genera
Spiders of China